The Ndaka language (or Indaaka, Ndaaka) is spoken by the Ndaka people in the Ituri Province, Mambasa Territory of the Democratic Republic of the Congo. It is lexically similar to the Mbo, Budu, Vanuma and Nyali languages.

References

Nyali languages
Languages of the Democratic Republic of the Congo